Tamanna Nusrat Bubly is a Bangladesh Awami League politician and a member of Bangladesh Parliament from a reserved seat. She is the widow of popular Awami League leader Lokman Hossain, who was assassinated in a gun attack in 2011, who was then sitting Narsingdi municipality mayor.

Career
Bubly was elected to parliament from reserved seat as a Bangladesh Awami League candidate in 2019. She was the women's affairs secretary of the Narsingdi District unit of the Bangladesh Awami League but later she expelled from the party for allegations to  use proxy in BA exams.

References

Awami League politicians
Living people
Women members of the Jatiya Sangsad
11th Jatiya Sangsad members
21st-century Bangladeshi women politicians
21st-century Bangladeshi politicians
1984 births